Erwin Sánchez Freking (born 19 October 1969) is a Bolivian former footballer who played as an attacking midfielder, currently manager of Oriente Petrolero.

Dubbed Platini, most of his professional career was spent in Portugal, amassing Primeira Liga totals of 288 matches and 59 goals over 13 seasons mainly in representation of Boavista and Benfica. Retiring in 2005, he subsequently became a coach.

From 2006 to 2009, Sánchez managed the Bolivia national team after having appeared as a player in the 1994 FIFA World Cup, the country's third participation.

Club career
Born in Santa Cruz de la Sierra, Sánchez started his career at hometown's Club Destroyers, then moved to Club Bolívar. He was signed by S.L. Benfica for the 1990–91 season, but was not very successful there, also being loaned to Lisbon neighbours G.D. Estoril Praia.

Sánchez joined Boavista F.C. after being released in 1992, eventually becoming one of the team's best players. This prompted a 1997 return to Benfica, but the player again failed to settle, returning to the Axadrezados (chequereds) and being crucial to the club's only league conquest in 2001, with nine goals in 33 games.

After a serious anterior cruciate ligament injury, Sánchez eventually lost importance in Boavista and left the club in 2004 after a coaching spell, returning home for a final season with Oriente Petrolero and retiring as a player at the age of 36. In his last appearance, on 14 March 2005 against Club Blooming, he assaulted referee Wilson Aliaga, being suspended for 18 months.

Sánchez had another managerial spell at Boavista, as well as two each at Blooming and Oriente Petrolero.

International career
Sánchez was a leading player for Bolivia, being crucial to the nation's qualification for the 1994 FIFA World Cup. The team exited the competition in the group stage, and he scored their only goal in a 3–1 loss against Spain; this was also the country's first and only goal in three appearances in World Cup tournaments.

Sánchez appeared in a total of 57 matches over 16 years, netting 15 times. He was part of their 1997 Copa América squad, playing all the matches save one for the runner-up hosts and scoring three goals, including in the final with Brazil.

In 2006, Sánchez was named national team manager, being dismissed after the unsuccessful 2010 World Cup qualifying campaign.

International goals

Personal life
Sánchez's son, also called Erwin, was also a Bolivian international midfielder.

Honours

Player
Benfica
Primeira Liga: 1990–91

Boavista
Primeira Liga: 2000–01
Taça de Portugal: 1996–97

Oriente Petrolero
Copa Aerosur: 2005

Manager
Blooming
Copa Cine Center: 2015

References

External links

1969 births
Living people
Bolivian people of German descent
Sportspeople from Santa Cruz de la Sierra
Bolivian footballers
Association football midfielders
Bolivian Primera División players
Club Destroyers players
Club Bolívar players
Oriente Petrolero players
Primeira Liga players
Segunda Divisão players
S.L. Benfica footballers
G.D. Estoril Praia players
Boavista F.C. players
S.L. Benfica B players
Bolivia youth international footballers
Bolivia international footballers
1994 FIFA World Cup players
1999 FIFA Confederations Cup players
1989 Copa América players
1991 Copa América players
1993 Copa América players
1997 Copa América players
1999 Copa América players
Bolivian expatriate footballers
Expatriate footballers in Portugal
Bolivian expatriate sportspeople in Portugal
Bolivian football managers
Primeira Liga managers
Boavista F.C. managers
Oriente Petrolero managers
Club Blooming managers
Bolivia national football team managers
2007 Copa América managers
Bolivian expatriate football managers
Expatriate football managers in Portugal